Jikji is a 2005 South Korean Mini series starring Han Min and Kim Jin-keun. It aired on MBC on Saturday, 3 December 2005 at 21:40 until 01:10. This series aired as an HD special drama for the 44th anniversary of MBC's founding.

Plot
It simultaneously shows that human love and the Buddha's mercy aren't different through Myo-Duk, who achieved the way of love and Baek-Woon, who achieved the way of victory and Buddhahood to save people from a dark age. It also tells about the chronicle life and love of them two and focuses on the heartbreaking love story of them who transcend their status.

Baek-Woon (played by Kim Jin-keun) was born as the youngest son of a poor family at the end of the Goryeo Dynasty and was raised by his grandmother. When his old mother suffers from the limitations of their status, she sends him to the temple at the age of 15 to follow the path of a monk. In the progress, Baek-Woon then meets Myo-Duk (played by Han-Min), the daughter of a prestigious family, by chance while training at a mountain temple.

Myo-duk has an outstanding talent for her thrifty family, but her mother, who was her filial piety, died early and her concubine grew up in her hands, so she had a crooked personality. She used her beauty to make a prank on the children of her nobility, but she is in a state of self-defense. Later, they fall in fateful love, but when Baek-Woon leaves the temple for the capital, Myo-Duk becomes a monk herself and to be with him and create the "Jikji".

Cast

Main
Han Min as Myo-duk (묘덕; 20–40 years old)
A daughter from a noble family. Not like woman in her age, Myo-duk is excellent at archery, dance, calligraphy, painting and academic excellence.
Kim Jin-geun as Baekwoon Kyung-han (백운경한; 37–60 years old)
His Personal name is Kyung-han (경한) and his Courtesy name is Baek-woon (백운). He is the Jikji's founder.

Supporting
Lee Jung-gil as King Choongsook
Yang Mi-kyung as Lady Won Deok-Bi
Won Mi-won as Kyung-han's old mother
Kim Byung-se as Prince Jungahn, Princess Soochoon's husband
Lee Il-hwa as Princess Soochoon, King Choongsook's half sister
Yoo Seung-bong as Myo-duk's father
Cha Joo-ok as Myo-duk's stepmother
Han Tae-il as a head of Buddhist monk
Kim Sang-koo as Kim Gye-saeng
Hwang Ui-kwon as Lee-Saek
Park Jong-sul as a Blacksmith
Kim Heung-soo as a Yuan Princess's bodyguard
Ahn Su-jung as a Yuan Princess
Lee Young-joon as a Buddhist monk
Lee Duk-jin as Suk-Chan
Yoon Su-hyun as a Daljam monk
Jang Nam-kyung as neighbor Lady Jo

Extended cast
Jang Tae-sung
Choi Sung-woong
Lee Hwa-jin
Kim Nam-kil
Yoo Jung-suk
Choi Sun-young
Park Tae-jin

Production
This series started filming in September 2005 exquisitely combined the secret scenery with the love of the main characters by using representative temples of Korea such as:
Seonun Temple (선운사) in Gochang, Jeollabuk-do.
Seonam Temple (선암사) in Suncheon, Jeollanam-do.
Hwaeom Temple (화엄사) in Gurye, Jeollanam-do.
Bongjeong Temple (봉정사) in Andong, Gyeongsangbuk-do.

References

MBC TV television dramas
South Korean historical television series
2005 South Korean television series debuts
2005 South Korean television series endings